Mankera  (In Punjabi and ), is the principal town of Mankera Tehsil, an administrative subdivision of Bhakkar District, in the Punjab province of Pakistan.

Bhakkar is located in the west of Punjab. The mighty Indus River flows on the western side of the district and the Jehlum and Chenab rivers both flow on the eastern side, all of which can be destructive during monsoon season. One third of the land is sandy, of which a small portion is irrigated by Thal canal and tube wells. The rest of the sandy land is cultivated and is entirely dependent upon rains.
People mostly depend on agriculture which is highly dependent on rain; as such people are poor. Education and health facilities are not adequately available.

History

Origin of the name and ancient history
The origins of Mankera according to tradition go back one thousand years BC; it is believed that Mankera was originally Malkherkot, founded by a Rajput called Mal Khera. The Mekan family have deep roots in Mankera. Mekan Raja ruled Mankera for 500 years. There is evidence that suggests a state by this name existed during Alexander's invasion of the subcontinent. Another tradition attempts to explain the name of Mankera: here most of the land is sandy with a number of sand dunes, and extremely hot summer weather which used to attract heavy sand storms. Due to the storms, sand dunes would shift from one place to another. In the local language sand dunes are called manr'r and the process of the shifting of sand is called kera. Both words combined to make Manr'rKera, which slowly turned to Mankera.  The Arabs however called it Manker Kot, and during Muhammad bin Qasim's rule in greater Sindh, the conquest of Mankera by one of his generals, Abul Asswad bin Zahar is recorded. The first Muslim governor of Mankera was Ahmed bin Khuzema who died in Mankera and is buried in Mankera Fortress.

Following the downfall of Arab rule in Sindh, the Hindu king of Kanauj took possession of Mankera followed by the Mekan. The Abdali kings annexed Mankera and the adjoining areas and the Baloch gave way to Saddo Zai Pathans. The Pathan rule of the state ended with the famous siege of Mankera by Ranjit Singh which resulted in the forfeiture of Nawab Surbuland's claim to Mankera and his retreat to Dera Ismail Khan.

Mankera Fortress
The fort was constructed in two phases. The initial construction of the brick fort was carried out during the time of the Baloch rule, and further fortification in the form of a thick mud wall was undertaken during the Pashtun rule. The mud is taken from the winter depths of the Indus River, then formed into fine powder. This powder-type mud was mixed with water for several days and properly meshed. In this way wet mud transforms into a type of glue. Today the fort and its fortification are mostly in ruins. The major part of the mud wall still exists, however decay and neglect is visible. The main fort is mostly in ruins except for a well, a tomb, and a few signs of masonry. The outer walls of the citadel are however intact. During the dying days of the Mughal empire, Mankera's Saddo Zai rulers with the help of their Abdali benefactors emerged as a force to reckon with in this area. Mankera was the seat of their dominions. Nowadays the tomb of Mankera is not in good condition and has undergone a lot of damage.

Sikh rule(1821-1846)
The Sikh occupation of Mankera is abundantly evident. Next to the congregational mosque (jamia masjid) of Mankera are the ruins of a temple built during the Sikh rule, and even the tomb of Nawab Surbuland Khan, just outside the main citadel has a Hindu aura about its construction.

The Sikh annexation of this area began in 1821, and was completed with the fall of Mankera in the autumn of that year. Ranjit Singh excellent hindu commander Misr Diwan Chand led the troops that besieged Mankera. The siege lasted for twenty-two days and at a great cost to the invaders. Mankera, fortified by the brick wall, had a distinct advantage of its position being in the middle of a desert. The besieging army had not only to deal with the musketry of the Mankera troops but had to find out ways to deal with natural difficulties as well. Water had to be carried for the troops from considerable distances. Ranjit Singh's ingenuity saved the day, as he ordered his army to dig several wells. Twelve such wells were dug.

The siege dragged on for twenty-two days during which time the Nawab held his own; however the desertions of his sardars and the demolition of one of the minarets of the jamia masjid — taken as a bad omen — forced the Nawab to surrender the fort to the Sikhs. The iron ball shot from the big guns, including the zamzama employed by Ranjit Singh during the Mankera expedition is still preserved in the mosque's compound. Following the surrender, the area was put under the direct control of the Lahore empire. Sikhs and Hindus settled inside the main (outer) fort, except one  Muslim family which continued living here. This Muslim family had settled here from Leiah during the dynasty of Saddo Zai. After the independence and creation of Pakistan in  August 1947, Hindus and Sikhs migrated to India and their vacated houses were given to the people migrated from India under a settlement scheme. The Sikh rule of Mankera ended in 1847 and for the next one hundred and forty years Mankera existed as a non-entity.

Other events
Mankera's other claim to fame is the incident which took place in 1794 when Prince Hummayun Shah, son of Taimur Shah, the Abdali King and a claimant to the throne of Kabul, made a vain attempt to overthrow his brother, Zaman Shah. His brother comprehensively defeated him and Hummayun fled to Thal Sagar. The Saddo Zai Nawab of Mankera, Nawab Mohammad Khan, apprehended him at Leaih. Hummayun's son was killed in the scuffle that followed his arrest, and at the behest of Zaman Shah, Nawab had Hummayun's eyes put out. Hummayun spent the rest of his life imprisoned in Mankera Fortress. A tomb in the middle of the fort is believed to be that of Prince Hummayun, and he is considered a minor saint by the locals. On the other hand, the Nawab received the title of Surbuland Khan and the territory of Dera Ismail Khan from the King. It was the same Surbuland Khan who had to surrender to Ranjit Singh some 27 years later and retreat to Dera Ismail Khan.

Mankera today 
 
Mankera is a subdivision (tehsil) currently under the supervision of the district government. Mankera's main bazaar has neat rows of shops on either side. The town has seven government schools − one high school and one elementary school for boys and one high school and four primary schools for girls. The first primary school has been in existence for over a hundred years.  There are also many other private schools in the town. A special school for disabled children and the addition of a degree college and a commerce college provide the town with ample resources to educate its youth. A forty-bed hospital caters to the health needs of the populace. The famous jamia masjid has been demolished and reconstructed. The streets are paved and wide, and the people congenial and hospitable. Tehsil Municipal Administration's sewerage and sanitation system is very poor.
Mankera has a rich Indo-Islamic culture, which is known as the colorful culture.
Mankera is the second biggest tehsil after Shergarh. The major source of income of Mankera's people is chickpeas (chana).
The city continues to have new shops of open in the market.

Malik Qadar Baksh was a famous teacher who grew up in Tehsil Mankera. He taught thousands of students in Punjab, Shahpur Sargodha, Mitha Tiwana, Jhang and the district headquarters, Bhakkar. He died on October 20, 1983, and is buried in the Sher Shah graveyard.

Sheikh Qadar Baksh was raised in Mankera and built a madrassa there. He also provided land to the British government in 1871. He had 4 sons, Nabi Bakhsh, Allah Bakash, Haji Muhammad Bakhsh and Haji Abdullah.

Muhammad Bakash was a companion of Poonja Jinnah and also he had relations with Sheikh Noor Muhammad. He helped Quaid-e-Azam Muhammad Ali Jinnah in his purpose in getting Pakistan. He had 7 sons. He provided land to the army of Pakistan in the country's early days, which now functions as a rest house in Mankera. His eldest son Muhammad Masoom was Hafiz-e-Quran. He was also very religious. Muhammad Bakash's other son was Muhammad Aslam, who was also Hafiz-e-Quran. He also served as a teacher in Govt. High School Mankera.

Transport 
The nearest airport to Mankera is Dera Ismail Khan – travelers used to be able to catch a flight either Islamabad or Peshawar to this city and then on to Mankera. However this airport is now out of use – the only way to get there is by bus. The bus takes 6 hours from Peshawar to reach Dera Ismail Khan, 7 hours from Islamabad, and 6 hours from Lahore. From Dera Ismail Khan it takes two hours to reach Mankera and from Bhakkar it takes a drive of 45 minutes.

Direct bus service is also available from Lahore.

One can easily get to Mankera through a fast APV car service from Niazi Adda, but APV car service is from Lahore to Jhang. From Jhang, there is an AC and non-AC bus/van service for Bhakkar and Dera Ismail Khan.

References

External links
 Mankera on BigBlueBall
 Map of Mankera
 Wasib | Ancient Riasat Mankera

Populated places in Bhakkar District